Cream is a dairy product.

Cream may also refer to:

Art, entertainment, and media

Music
Cream (band), 1960s British rock supergroup 
Cream (Japanese group), Japanese hip hop group
Cream (rapper) (born 1990), South Korean musician
The Cream (album), a 1978 live album by John Lee Hooker
"Cream" (Blank & Jones song), 1999
"Cream" (Prince song), with the New Power Generation
"C.R.E.A.M." (1993), "Cash Rules Everything Around Me" by the Wu-Tang Clan
Cream (album), by Sandra Collins

Fictional characters
Cream the Rabbit, a Sonic the Hedgehog character
Cream, major character in The Adventures of Cookie & Cream
Cream, the stand of minor antagonist Vanilla Ice in JoJo's Bizarre Adventure: Stardust Crusaders

Film
Cream (film), 2014 British film

Periodicals
Creem, American music magazine
Creme (magazine), New Zealand magazine for girls

Food and drink
Coconut cream, a common ingredient in curries
Cream ale, a type of beer
Cream soda (disambiguation)
Creamed corn

Fillings or toppings
Bavarian cream
Buttercream
Chiboust cream
Crema (dairy product)
Crème anglaise
Crème fraîche
Custard
Custard cream
Sour cream
Whipped cream (also called Chantilly cream)

Places
Cream (nightclub), Liverpool, England
Cream, Wisconsin, United States
Cream Ridge, New Jersey, United States
Cream City, Ohio, United States

Topical substances
Cream (pharmacy), a preparation applied to a body surface
Cold cream, a substance to smooth skin and remove make-up
The cream, a testosterone-based ointment used to mask steroid use
Aqueous cream, a light, hydrocarbon-based emulsion
Anti-aging cream
Barrier cream
CC cream

Other uses
Cream (colour)
Cream (software), a text editor
Cream gene, an equine dilution gene
Cream of the crop (disambiguation)
Crème de la crème (disambiguation)
Cosmic Ray Energetics and Mass (CREAM), a series of cosmic ray experiments
Slang term for ejaculate or ejaculation (See also cream pie)

See also
Crème (disambiguation)
Crema (disambiguation)
Creaming (disambiguation)